RootsTech is a family history and technology conference and trade show held annually in the Salt Palace Convention Center, Salt Lake City, Utah. In 2017 it claimed to be the world's largest family-history technology conference. It is the successor to three former conferences: the Conference on Computerized Family History and Genealogy, the Family History Technology Workshop and the FamilySearch Developers Conference. Over the years, RootsTech has welcomed a number of celebrities, television personalities, and actors as keynote speakers.

History
RootsTech is an outgrowth of a conference started at Brigham Young University (BYU) in Provo, Utah. BYU's manager of Conferences and Workshops, Bob Hales, noted that their long running "Annual Genealogy and Family History Conference"  held at the end of July each year was experiencing incredible interest in a track devoted to technology in genealogy. In 1997, Hales met with a local accredited genealogist and technology enthusiast, Alan Mann, to ask for his help in creating a new conference, breaking it off from the Annual Conference. They decided to hold the new conference in March each year to avoid conflict with the July conference. The first event was held March 1998 and drew 400 paid attendees. By 1999, the second Computerized Genealogy Conference drew more attendees than BYU's Annual Genealogy and Family History Conference, coming from 49 states and 3 countries. Several strategies were employed to accommodate more attendees, including offering the same classes in evening sessions, expanding to other buildings (one of which involved transport by vans), and freeing more meeting rooms by moving exhibitors out of meeting rooms into the hallways. By 2001, the conference organizers turned away hundreds of registrations each year. In 2003, the only national competing event, GenTech, was cancelled, leading to further demand for the BYU Annual Computerized Genealogy Conference.

Over the years, other events were organized to be held a day or two before this annual conference to take advantage of the attendance of exhibitors and developers from around the world. This included the Family History Technology Workshop which displayed and discussed developments in technology for genealogists and the FamilySearch Developers Conference. In 2008, the Family History Department of the Church of Jesus Christ of Latter-day Saints became co-sponsor of these events and the search began for a new venue. The 2010 National Genealogical Society (NGS) Conference was scheduled to be held in Salt Lake City. With cooperation from the local NGS sponsor, the Utah Genealogical Association, the Family History Technology Workshop, and the FamilySearch Developers Conference, the Computerized Genealogy Conference organizers met with NGS and proposed a combined conference, which was held in April 2010. The event was highly successful, and led to plans to move the Computerized Genealogy Conference to Salt Lake City for future events. The name of the conference was changed to RootsTech.

The first RootsTech conference was held in Salt Lake City in February 2011, drawing around 3,000 people.  It was held again in 2012, drawing 4,500 people.  In 2013, it drew 6,700 registered attendees with over 13,600 remote attendees and many attendees and vendors coming from other countries around the world.  RootsTech had become the largest genealogy and family history conference held in North America. The 2014 event was held at the Salt Palace where nearly 13,000 attended in person with over 100,000 remote participants. At the 2015 RootsTech conference, Laura Bush and her daughter were keynote speakers. Over 25,000 people were reported to have attended the 2016 RootsTech from 50 US states and 30 countries. In 2019 paid attendees dropped by 10% and live stream views dropped by 28% compared to 2018.

In October 2019, RootsTech held a conference in London, with almost 10,000 people attending. 

RootsTech Connect 2021 was transitioned to a free virtual experience hosted online in 11 languages. It was attended by over 1 million participants from 242 countries who were able to watch approximately 2,000 genealogical class sessions on-demand taught by experts, archivists and companies. The 2021 conference included a Genetic Genealogy track, a song contest and a virtual expo hall with 85 exhibitors.

References

External links
 
 19 presentations from RootsTech 2014 streamed online
Sessions recorded at RootsTech 2019

Family history
Genealogy and the Church of Jesus Christ of Latter-day Saints
Trade shows in the United States
Technology conferences
2011 establishments in Utah